Dobri Dol is a village in the municipality of Sopište, North Macedonia.

Demographics
According to the 2002 census, the village had a total of 431 inhabitants. Ethnic groups in the village include:

 Macedonians - 424 (98.3%)
 Turks - 1 (0.2%)
 Serbs - 1 (0.2%)
 Vlachs- 2 (0.4%)
 Others - 3 (0.6%)

References

Villages in Sopište Municipality